Patna State, was a princely state in the Eastern States Agency of India during the British Raj. It had its capital at Balangir (cg).

History
The foundation of the Patna kingdom was laid by Ramai Deva of the Chauhan dynasty in 1360 CE when he overthrew Hattahamir Deb, the administrator of the region as the Eastern Ganga Empire started weakening following invasions from the northern part of the subcontinent. The Chauhan reign eventually extends over the region under its cadet branches which include the kingdoms of Sambalpur State, Sonepur State and the zamindaries of Khariar and Jarasingha. The history of the Chauhan rule in the region is also obtained from the 16th century palm-leaf manuscript Kosalananda Kavya.

After Indian independence, Patna's last ruler Rajendra Narayan Singh Deo acceded to the newly independent Dominion of India, on 1 January 1948 with the state forming much of the present day Balangir district. Rajendra Narayan Singh Deo, built a new career as an elected politician and served as Chief Minister of Orissa from 8 March 1967 to 9 January 1971.

Rulers
The rulers of Patna state of the Chauhan Dynasty:

Ramai Deva (1360–1380)
Mahalinga Deva (1380–1385)
Vatsaraja Deva (1385–1410)
Vaijala Deva I (1410–1430)
Bhojaraj Deva (1430–1455)
Pratap Rudra Deva I (1455–1480)
Bhupal Deva I (1480–1500)
Vikramaditya Deva I (1500–1520)
Vaijal Deva II (1520–1540)
Bajra Hiradhara Deva (1540–1570)
Narsingh Deva (1570–1577)
Hamir Deva (1577–1581)
Pratap Deva II (1581–1620)
Vikramaditya Deva II (1620–1640)
Mukunda Deva (1640–1670)
Balaram Deva (1670–1678)
Hrdesha Deva (1678–1685)
Rai Singh Deva (1685–1762)
Prithviraj Deva (1762–1765)
Ramchandra Singh Deo I (1765–1820)
Bhupal Singh Deo (1820–1848)
Hiravajra Singh Deo (1848–1866)
Pratap Singh Deo (1866–25 November 1878)
Ramchandra Singh Deo II (25 November 1878-1895)
Lal Dalganjan Singh Deo (1895–1910)
Prithviraj Singh (1910–1924)
Rajendra Narayan Singh Deo (1924–1 January 1948)

Titular
Rajendra Narayan Singh Deo (1 January 1948 to 23 February 1975)
Rajraj Singh Deo (23 February 1975 to April 2004)
Kanak Vardhan Singh Deo (April 2004 – current)

Gallery

See also 
Eastern States Agency
Political integration of India

References

Rajputs
Princely states of Odisha
Balangir district
States and territories disestablished in 1948
Central Provinces
Balangir
14th-century establishments in India
1360 establishments in Asia
1948 disestablishments in India